Boston is an unincorporated community in Belmont County, in the U.S. state of Ohio.

History
Boston was laid out in 1834. At the beginning of the 20th century, Boston had about 100 inhabitants.

References

Unincorporated communities in Belmont County, Ohio
1834 establishments in Ohio
Populated places established in 1834
Unincorporated communities in Ohio